Sarah Leo is a Canadian politician. Leo served as President of Nunatsiavut, an autonomous Inuit region of Newfoundland and Labrador, Canada. Along with the Nunatsiavut government, she has been critical of the Lower Churchill Project.

Career
From 2006-2010, Leo served as the AngajukKâk of Nain.

Leo was first elected as President in 2012 replacing Jim Lyall. She did not seek re-election in the 2016 election.

She currently serves as the chief operating officer of the Nunatsiavut Group of Companies.

Electoral record

2012 election

Round 1

Round 2

References

Living people
Inuit from Newfoundland and Labrador
Inuit politicians
Canadian Inuit women
People from Nain, Newfoundland and Labrador
Year of birth missing (living people)
Indigenous leaders in Atlantic Canada